Practical Performance Car Magazine ("PPC") is a British car magazine published monthly by Blockhead Media. The magazine uses the strap-lines "Performance Tuning for Grown Ups" and "Building, tuning & buying real-world performance cars".

The magazine was launched in May 2004 by former Practical Classics magazine staff members and takes an expert DIY approach to its stated interest areas (above), covering topics in three distinct sections.

In addition, they are currently Associate Sponsors of the LMA Euro Saloons Championship.

Front
This section of the magazine generally includes articles of interest, feature cars, news and updates on those cars owned by the magazine's staff and its readership.

Tech
This section of the magazine generally includes technical and expert-technical articles on a very wide range of topics such as modifications to the chassis, engine, suspension or engine management of a selected car. Articles are usually based on technical modifications that are widely applicable, or applicable to a popular model. The section also includes an opportunity for readers to submit their own technical project, which, if selected, will be featured in the magazine.

Buyer
This section of the magazine, as the name suggests, offers advice and tips on buying cars. Each month, the magazine will select a car to feature (for example the Lotus Carlton featured in the October 2006 edition), and provide a multi-page feature covering the car's history, known issues and attractions and advice regarding prices and maintenance.

This section also includes classified adverts from both trade and private advertisers.

References

External links
PPC Magazine homepage.

Automobile magazines published in the United Kingdom
Monthly magazines published in the United Kingdom